Thappu Thalangal is a 1978 Indian Tamil-language film directed by K. Balachander and produced by R. Venkataraman starring Rajinikanth, Premila Joshi and Saritha in her film debut. It was made simultaneously and released in Kannada as Thappida Thala. The film was remade in Malayalam as Kazhukan. Although widely appreciated for the performances of Rajinikanth and Saritha, Thappu Thalangal was not a box office success.

Plot 
Devu, a local thug whose weapon of choice is a bicycle chain he sports casually around the neck. Devu charges  30 to slice a finger,  300 to chop a hand,  3000 for the leg, and ten times as much to dispose off the whole body. On one of his nightly rounds, Devu is pursued by a cop and seeks refuge at a sex worker house run by a hooker Sarasu, played to perfection by Saritha. Despite her vehement protests, he stays put and leaves only at daybreak, but her persistent cough stays with him. At a theatre, Devu watches an advertisement for Glycodin Cough Syrup and proceeds to buy her a bottle. Devu and Sarasu bond over the cough syrup and philosophise late into the night, exchanging notes on their immoral lifestyles.

Devu's assault on a trade union leader delivering medicine to a critically ill worker leads to a mishap. Watching the wailings of the widow of the worker, Devu is traumatised and breaks down at Sarasu's place. In an inspired moment, he suggests they remap their lives and chart a moral course. Sarasu is attracted by the notion of giving up prostitution and leading a normal life as Devu's wife, though she wonders if they'll be able to pull it off. The couple go to great lengths to secure a job for Devu and lead a normal life, but there are too many skeletons in the closet. Devu is no longer feared for his might, and Sarasu's past clientele continue to haunt the joint. Sarasu gets a loan for Devu from his evil brother Soma, who continues to harass her on that pretext. In a particularly traumatic sequence of events, Sarasu is raped by Soma as a helpless Devu watches, pinned down by Soma's henchmen. The couple resolve to repay Soma's loan, and Devu undertakes a botched robbery attempt. Devu is imprisoned and in his absence, Sarasu has an abortion. The couple's plans for normality never attain fruition. The inevitable return to lives of vice is especially tragic and heartbreaking.

Devu's inherent goodness is contrasted with his "evil twin", a stepbrother Soma who thwarts his every attempt at morality and finally succumbs at Devu's hands. Kamalhaasan has an interesting cameo as a Hindi speaking client of Sarasu. Balachander skewers middle-class morality and takes potshots at the hypocrisy of do-gooders. In the final analysis, the film is an indictment of society at large, for not allowing lesser mortals to rejoin society and return to a life of normality.

Cast 
 Rajinikanth as Devu
 Saritha as Sarasu 
 Sundar Raj as Soma
 Kamal Haasan as Amrit Lal (uncredited)
 Pramila Joshai as Soma's wife

Production
Thappu Thalangal was simultaneously filmed in Kannada as Thappida Thala.

Soundtrack 
All songs were written by Kannadasan in Tamil, and  Hunsur Krishnamurthy in Kannada and composed by Vijaya Bhaskar.
Tamil tracklist

References

External links 
 

1970s Kannada-language films
1978 multilingual films
1970s Tamil-language films
1978 films
Films about prostitution in India
Films directed by K. Balachander
Films scored by Vijaya Bhaskar
Films set in Bangalore
Films with screenplays by K. Balachander
Indian black-and-white films
Indian multilingual films
Tamil films remade in other languages